Penion ormesi is a species of very large predatory sea snail or whelk, a marine gastropod mollusc in the family Buccinidae, the true whelks.

Description
Penion ormesi is a large to very large species of siphon whelk. P. ormesi is benthic, and typically inhabits soft-sediments on the continental shelf.

Recent genetic and geometric morphometric research using shell shape and size has demonstrated that a formerly recognised species Penion cuvierianus jeakingsi is closely related to Penion ormesi, and the taxon has been synonymised. However, further genetic and morphological variation observed among these snails suggests that there may be further diversity within this lineage.

Distribution
The species is endemic to New Zealand and is found in the Cook Strait and off the west coast of the South Island. Fossils of the species are recorded from Wanganui.

References

External links
 Museum of New Zealand Te Papa Tongarewa, Taxon: Penion ormesi Powell, 1927 (Species)
 Natural History Museum Rotterdam - Mollusca - Gastropoda - Buccinidae

Buccinidae
Gastropods of New Zealand
Gastropods described in 1927